Major-General Henry Blackwood MacCall  (15 August 1845 – 22 July 1921) was a senior British Army officer.

Military career
MacCall was commissioned into the 60th Regiment of Foot on 16 February 1864. He served as commanding officer of the 1st Battalion, the King's Royal Rifle Corps with the Isazai Expedition in 1892, the Chitral Expedition in 1895 and the Siege of Malakand in 1897. He went on to be commander of the 41st Regimental District in Cardiff in 1897, then transferred to British India as Deputy Adjutant General in India in February 1899. After the outbreak of the Second Boer War saw several senior officers posted to South Africa in late 1899, MacCall was appointed temporary in command of the Peshawar district as its commander received another posting on 4 January 1900. He transferred to the Bangalore command in early August 1900, and received a substantive appointment as commander of a 2nd Class District in India in 1901.

He retired in August 1902 but was recalled to serve as General Officer Commanding 59th (2nd North Midland) Division on Home Service from January 1915 to November 1915.

References

1845 births
1921 deaths
British Army generals of World War I
Companions of the Order of the Bath
King's Royal Rifle Corps officers
Military personnel from Paris
British Army major generals
British military personnel of the Chitral Expedition
British military personnel of the Malakand Frontier War